Sam Docherty (born 17 October 1993) is an Australian rules footballer who plays for and is a former co-captain for the Carlton Football Club in the Australian Football League (AFL). He was recruited from the Gippsland Power in the TAC Cup with the 12th selection in the 2011 AFL Draft.

Early life
Docherty grew up on Phillip Island and was a supporter of the Carlton Football Club. Docherty learned the game through the Phillip Island Auskick program. He played all of his junior football for Phillip Island Bulldogs in the Alberton Football Netball League making his A grade debut as a 15 year old in 2009 playing alongside his older brother Josh. He played 13 games and kicked 2 goals for the A Grade plus was named in the best players in 7 games.

In 2010 as a 16-year-old Docherty no longer played under-18 football for Phillip Island despite being picked for the Alberton Interleague team; he played 21 games for the A Grade and kicked 16 goals after his pre-season was hampered when he strained the quadratus lumberum muscle in his back, and as a result he missed selection in Gippsland Power's TAC Cup squad as an underage player.

In 2011 Docherty played 16 games for the Gippsland Power in the TAC Cup playing across the half back line. Docherty used his run and carry skills for the Power off half back averaging 22 disposals a game plus ranked second in the entire competition in mark from opposition kicks and rebound 50s in the TAC Cup. Sam only played 1 game for Phillip Island in which he was named second best for the Bulldogs and his brother Josh was named best. Despite his form for Gippsland, Docherty missed out on the initial Vic Country squad for the 2011 AFL Under 18 Championships; however, he was brought in for the fourth game of the carnival with an eye-catching display across half-back against WA in Geelong with 21 possessions and five rebound 50s. He then remained in the Vic Country team that faced Vic Metro in the last round of the championships. A hip injury while playing for the Power Docherty could not perform at the AFL draft camp. At the Gippsland Power awards he won the Most Disciplined and Trainers Awards plus was named in the 2011 TAC Cup Team of the Year. Despite the injury and being relatively unknown to AFL recruiters at the start of the year, Docherty was expected to be a first-round pick in the 2011 AFL draft. He was ultimately selected by the Brisbane Lions with their second selection (pick No. 12 overall) at the 2011 AFL National Draft. He became the first player from Phillip Island to be drafted into the AFL.

AFL career

Brisbane Lions (2011–2013)
He struggled with his hip injury when he first arrived at Brisbane, almost immediately underwent surgery to correct a minor complaint he had carried through the 2011 season. It meant that he would spend the bulk of his first pre-season in rehab. After one practice match, a hamstring strain sidelined him for another month. He then came back in round 5 and spent all of the 2012 playing for the Brisbane reserves side in the North East Australian Football League (NEAFL). Docherty was named as a senior emergency on a couple of occasions. But, in the end, his delayed start to the season meant that he left his run a little too late for an AFL debut. He was pivotal in Brisbane's claiming the NEAFL premiership flag, his skill, poise and efficient disposals in difficult conditions at Yeronga in the NEAFL northern conference final against the NT Thunder was impressive.

He made his AFL debut in round 4 of the 2013 AFL season against North Melbourne wearing number 1, he became the 150th player to play for the Brisbane Lions. He played 13 AFL games for the season, usually as the sub; he was the sub in 5 games and was subbed off on one occasion. He averaged 13 disposals playing off half back. In the 2013 season he played 6 NEAFL games which he impressed in, he averaged 21 disposals per match and demonstrated that he can find the ball, racking up 30 plus twice. At the end of the 2013 season as Michael Voss was sacked as Brisbane coach, Docherty was uncontracted with the Lions and told his manager he wanted to come home back to Victoria. Western Bulldogs, Carlton and Essendon all showed interest in Docherty; however, Carlton were the front runners. 
After meeting with Carlton, Docherty nominated them as his destination club was traded to the Carlton Football Club for pick 33 in the 2013 AFL Draft during the 2013 trade period. Docherty was referred to in Brisbane as one of the "Go Home Five" in a messy off-season that also saw fellow Brisbane youngsters who were recruited in 2010 and 2011 Elliot Yeo, Billy Longer, Jared Polec and Patrick Karnezis all walk out on the club.

Carlton (2013–present)
Arriving at Carlton was a lifelong dream for Docherty; however, he had an unfortunate preseason for the Blues. Carlton had made the finals in 2013 and were expecting to improve with the acquisitions of Docherty and Dale Thomas. While he was away overseas he hurt his knee hiking, aggravating his injury from early 2013 and before leaving for Carlton's preseason camp in America he woke up one morning with a puffy eye, looking like he had been punched. It turned out to be a rare auto-immune disease which required surgery. He was still able to attend the camp but received a phone call to hear that his father Eddie had died suddenly after a heart attack at age 53. His funeral was held at the Phillip Island football club rooms, where he had been a player and coach of the club.

Sam started the season with the Northern Blues but had to wait until round 7 to make his AFL debut for Carlton after recovering from a strained a tendon in his quad while on pre season camp, which eventually required surgery despite initially being diagnosed as tendinitis in his knee. It was a huge match against Collingwood on a Friday night at the MCG, in front of a crowd of 68,000, he started from the interchange bench and impressed with his poise under pressure as the Blues went down by 24 points. He went on thereafter to play all sixteen remaining senior games for Carlton in 2014. He averaged 18 disposals a game and kicked 7 goals for the Blues; his highlight of the year was against his old team, Docherty gathered 30 possessions and kicked a goal.

Carlton were intent on redemption in 2015; however, the Blues slipped even further to endure one of the club's worst-ever seasons, finishing last with 4 wins. Coach Mick Malthouse was sacked in late May and many players were criticised except Docherty, who had improved from previous seasons to average 21 disposals and 6 marks in his 19 games. He finished 6th in the John Nicholls Medal as Carlton's best and fairest player. Docherty would also sign a three-year contract extension during 2015 to keep him at Carlton until the end of the 2018 season. He was also selected in the AFL Players’ Association 2015 22Under22 preliminary squad.

Docherty improved again on previous seasons during 2016, he would go on to play all 22 games for the Blues under new coach Brendon Bolton. Carlton improved from 2015 to notch up seven wins for the season, three more than last year and the Blues ended up finishing 14th on the ladder. Averaging 25 disposals off half-back, he and Kade Simpson forged a strong partnership in defence, making it much harder for the opposition to score. Docherty was rewarded with the John Nicholls Medal as Carlton's best and fairest player, he was also named in the 40-man squad for the All-Australian team and the  AFL Players’ Association’s final 22Under22 team. He also took home Carlton's Most Improved Player award.

2017 saw Docherty continue to perform at an elite level. Docherty led the AFL in kicks, marks and was top 5 in overall meters gained and rebounds from defensive 50. Docherty was rewarded for his stellar season with his maiden All-Australian selection in 2017 in the half back line.

Docherty ruptured his anterior cruciate ligament during pre-season training on 15 November 2017, and missed the entire 2018 AFL season as a result. Despite his injury he was newly endorsed by the playing group as the club's joint vice-captain prior to the season commencing.

In October 2018, Docherty and Patrick Cripps were named the new co-captains of the club.

Docherty ruptured his anterior cruciate ligament during pre-season training on 10 December 2018, with no timeline on a return. It was his second ACL injury and on the same knee as his 2017 injury.

Statistics
Statistics are correct to the end of round 15 2021

|- style="background:#EAEAEA"
| scope="row" text-align:center | 2013
| 
| 1 || 13 || 1 || 2 || 96 || 78 || 174 || 39 || 25 || 0.1 || 0.2 || 7.4 || 6.0 || 13.4 || 3.0 || 1.9 || 0 
|-
| scope="row" text-align:center | 2014
| 
| 15 || 16 || 7 || 8 || 207 || 90 || 297 || 82 || 43 || 0.4 || 0.5 || 12.9 || 5.6 || 18.6 || 5.1 || 2.7 || 0
|- style="background:#EAEAEA"
| scope="row" text-align:center | 2015
| 
| 15 || 19 || 2 || 2 || 260 || 141 || 401 || 116 || 40 || 0.1 || 0.1 || 13.7 || 7.4 || 21.1 || 6.1 || 2.1 || 0
|-
| scope="row" text-align:center | 2016
| 
| 15 || 22 || 1 || 2 || 359 || 207 || 566 || 173 || 57 || 0.1 || 0.1 || 16.3 || 9.4 || 25.7 || 7.9 || 2.6 || 1
|- style="background:#EAEAEA"
| scope="row" text-align:center | 2017
| 
| 15 || 22 || 3 || 3 || 460 || 153 || 613 || bgcolor="CAE1FF" | 199† || 73 || 0.1 || 0.1 || 20.9 || 7.0 || 27.9 || bgcolor="CAE1FF" | 9.1† || 3.3 || 5
|-
| scope="row" text-align:center | 2018
| 
| 15 || 0 || — || — || — || — || — || — || — || — || — || — || — || — || — || — || —
|- style="background:#EAEAEA"
| scope="row" text-align:center | 2019
| 
| 15 || 0 || — || — || — || — || — || — || — || — || — || — || — || — || — || — || —
|-
| scope="row" text-align:center | 2020
| 
| 15 || 16 || 0 || 1 || 215 || 82 || 297 || 83 || 19 || 0.0 || 0.1 || 13.4 || 5.1 || 18.6 || 5.2 || 1.2 || 1
|- class="sortbottom"
|- style="background:#EAEAEA"
| scope="row" text-align:center | 2021
| 
| 15 || 14 || 0 || 0 || 252 || 88 || 340 || 107 || 31 || 0.0 || 0.0 || 18.0 || 6.2 || 24.2 || 7.6 || 2.2 || 2
|-
! colspan=3 | Career
! 122
! 14
! 18
! 1850
! 839
! 2689
! 799
! 288
! 0.1
! 0.1
! 15.1
! 6.8
! 22.0
! 6.5
! 2.3
! 9
|}

References

External links

Living people
1993 births
Brisbane Lions players
Carlton Football Club players
Gippsland Power players
Australian people of Scottish descent
Australian rules footballers from Victoria (Australia)
John Nicholls Medal winners
All-Australians (AFL)